Zlēkas Parish is an administrative unit of the Ventspils Municipality, Latvia.The parish has a population of 577 (as of 1/07/2010) and covers an area of 107.155 km2.

Villages of Zlēkas Parish 
 Krācnieki
 Laidzesciems
 Pasilciems
 Vāverciems
 Veclīcnieki
 Zlēkas

External links 
 Zlēkas parish in Latvian

Parishes of Latvia
Ventspils Municipality